Events from the year 1853 in the United States.

Incumbents

Federal government 
 President: Millard Fillmore (W-New York) (until March 4), Franklin Pierce (D-New Hampshire) (starting March 4)
 Vice President:
 until March 4: vacant
 March 4–April 18: William R. King (D-Alabama)
 starting April 18: vacant
 Chief Justice: Roger B. Taney (Maryland)
 Speaker of the House of Representatives: Linn Boyd (D-Kentucky)
 Congress: 32nd (until March 4), 33rd (starting March 4)

Events

January–March
 

 January – Stephen Foster's "My Old Kentucky Home, Good Night", which is later adopted as the state song of Kentucky under the name "My Old Kentucky Home", is published by Firth, Pond, & Company.
 January 6
 President-elect Franklin Pierce and his family are involved in a train wreck near Andover, Massachusetts. Pierce's 11-year-old son Benjamin is killed in the crash.
 East Florida Seminary is established; it is the oldest institution of what later becomes the University of Florida.
 February 22 – Washington University in St. Louis is founded as Eliot Seminary.
 March – Levi Strauss & Co. is founded in San Francisco, California.
 March 2 – Washington Territory is created from Oregon Territory.
 March 4 – Franklin Pierce becomes the 14th President of the United States, affirming the oath of office, and William R. King becomes Vice President of the United States.
 March 5 – Steinway & Sons, a piano maker, is founded in Manhattan by the German immigrant Henry E. Steinway (Heinrich E. Steinweg) and his family.

April–June
 April 4 – Regular operation of the St. Lawrence and Atlantic Railroad begins between Montreal and Portland, Maine.
 April 18 – Vice President William R. King dies of tuberculosis in Selma, Alabama, without having carried out any duties of the office. 
 May – An outbreak of yellow fever kills 7,790 in New Orleans.
 May 6 – Norwalk rail accident: A train runs off an open swing bridge into a river in Norwalk, Connecticut, killing 56.
 May 11 – Shimer College is founded in Mount Carroll, Illinois, with 11 students.
 May 23 – The first plat for Seattle, Washington, is laid out.

July–September
 July 1 – The Latting Observatory is opened for selected guests in New York City as part of the Exhibition of the Industry of All Nations. It is the tallest structure in the city at the time.
 July 2 – Koszta Affair: American Captain Duncan Ingraham commanding the USS St. Louis threatens to open fire upon an Austrian ship holding Martin Koszta as a prisoner. Koszta, who is in the process of obtaining American citizenship, is later returned to the U.S.
 July 8 – U.S. Commodore Matthew Perry arrives in Edo Bay with a request for a trade treaty.
 July 14 – The Exhibition of the Industry of All Nations world's fair begins in New York City.
 July 25 – Outlaw and bandit Joaquin Murrieta is killed in California.
 August 24 – Potato chips are traditionally said to have been invented on this date by George Crum in Saratoga Springs, New York.

October–December

 October 4 – The Great Republic, the largest wooden clipper ship ever constructed, is launched in Boston by Donald McKay.
 October 15 – William Walker sets out with 45 men to conquer the Mexican territories of Baja California and Sonora.
 November 11 – Voters in Massachusetts reject all eight proposals from the state's Constitutional Convention that was held from May 4 to August 2.
 December 7 – Erie Gauge War: Citizens of the Erie, Pennsylvania, area act to stop new track being laid to resolve rail gauge differences coming from neighboring Ohio and New York.
 December 25 – Cincinnati riot of 1853: Cardinal Gaetano Bedini's visit to Cincinnati, Ohio, sparks a Christmas Day protest that leads to the death of a protester in brawl with police.
 December 30 – Gadsden Purchase: U.S. Ambassador James Gadsden signs a treaty to buy approximately 29,600 sq mi (77,000 km2) of land south of the Gila River and west of the Rio Grande from Mexico to facilitate railroad building in the Southwest.

Undated
 Yontoket massacre: More than 450 Tolowa people are killed at Yontocket, California, by a citizen militia from Crescent City.
 The high school known as the Wheaton Academy is founded in West Chicago, Illinois.

Ongoing
 California Gold Rush (1848–1855)

Births
 January 1 – Harry A. Richardson, U.S. Senator from Delaware from 1907 to 1913 (died 1928)
 January 2 – Packy Dillon, baseball player (died 1902)
 January 6 – Woodbridge N. Ferris, 28th Governor of Michigan from 1913 to 1917 and U.S. Senator from Michigan from 1923 to 1928 (died 1928)
 January 17 – Alva Belmont, multi-millionaire socialite and suffrage activist (died 1933)
 January 19 – Stephen M. White, U.S. Senator from California from 1893 to 1899 (died 1901)
 February 3 – Hudson Maxim, inventor, chemist (died 1927)  
 February 16 – Charles J. Hughes, Jr., U.S. Senator from Colorado from 1909 to 1911 (died 1911)
 February 18 – Ernest Fenollosa, Orientalist (died 1908 in the United Kingdom)
 March 4 – Alexander S. Clay, U.S. Senator from Georgia from 1897 to 1910 (died 1910)
 March 5 – Howard Pyle, artist and fiction writer (died 1911)
 April 8 – Laura Alberta Linton, chemist (died 1915)
 April 23 – Thomas Nelson Page, writer and lawyer (died 1922)
 May 3 – E. W. Howe, author and editor (died 1937)
 May 8 – Katharine Lente Stevenson, reformer, missionary and editor (died 1919)
 June 12 – Chester Adgate Congdon, Minnesota mining magnate (died 1916)
 July 24 – William Gillette, actor, playwright and stage-manager (died 1937)
 July 27 – Elizabeth Plankinton, Milwaukee philanthropist (died 1923 in Switzerland)
 September 17 – Henry Churchill de Mille, dramatist and playwright (died 1893)
 October 14 – John William Kendrick, railroad executive (died 1924)
 November 9 – Stanford White, architect (murdered 1906)
 November 13 – John Drew, Jr., actor (died 1927)
 November 26 – Bat Masterson, lawman (died 1921)
 December 23 – William Henry Moody, 35th United States Secretary of the Navy, 45th United States Attorney General, and Associate Justice of the Supreme Court of the United States (died 1917)
 December 31 – Tasker H. Bliss, general (died 1930)

Deaths
 January 16 – Robert Lucas, governor of Ohio (born 1781)
 January 26 – Sylvester Judd, novelist (born 1813)
 March 30 – Abigail Fillmore, First Lady of the United States and Second Lady of the United States as wife of Millard Fillmore (born 1798)
 April 13 – James Iredell Jr., 23rd Governor of North Carolina from 1827 to 1828 (born 1788)
 April 18 – William R. King, 13th Vice President of the United States from March to April 1853 (born 1786)
 May 2 – Jesse B. Thomas, U.S. Senator from Illinois from 1818 to 1829 (born 1777)
 July 24 – Hezekiah C. Seymour, civil engineer (born 1811)
 August 23 – Alexander Calder, first mayor of Beaumont, Texas (born 1806)
 September 5 – George Poindexter, 2nd Governor of Mississippi from 1820 to 1822 and U.S. Senator from Mississippi from 1830 to 1835 (born 1779)
 October 5 – Mahlon Dickerson, judge and politician (born 1770)
 October 27 – Maria White Lowell, poet (born 1821)
 November 15 – Charles G. Atherton, U.S. Senator from New Hampshire from 1843 to 1849 and in 1853 (born 1804)
 December 28 – Sarah Goodridge, miniature painter (born 1788)

See also
Timeline of United States history (1820–1859)

References

External links
 

 
1850s in the United States
United States
United States
Years of the 19th century in the United States